The name Lloyd Webber, composite of a middle and family name, may refer to:

William Lloyd Webber (1914–1982), English organist and composer
Andrew Lloyd Webber, Baron Lloyd-Webber (born 1948), son of William, English composer of musical theatre
Julian Lloyd Webber (born 1951), son of William and brother of Andrew, English cellist
Imogen Lloyd Webber (born 1978), daughter of Andrew, English theatre producer
Nicholas Lloyd Webber (born 1979), son of Andrew, English composer and music producer

English-language surnames
Show business families of the United Kingdom